Bahar Şahin (born 4 May 1997) is a Turkish actress.

Life and career 
Bahar Şahin was born in Ankara in 1997. Her family is originally from Artvin. When she was 12 years old, she settled with her family in Istanbul and pursued her education and training life there. She joined the theatre classes during her school years. Şahin made her television debut in 2015 with the series O Hayat Benim. Later, she took part in films such as Yol Arkadaşım, Yol Arkadaşım 2, and İyi Oyun and was cast in a number of series such as Lise Devriyesi and Servet. Between 2019 and 2020, she rose to prominence by playing the character of Ceren in the series Zalim İstanbul, for which she received a Golden Butterfly Award nomination for Best Actress. In 2020, she made her debut in the series İyi Aile Babası and depicted the character of Yağmur.

Filmography

Awards and nominations 
 Promising Actor - Second International İzmir Film Festival (2019)
 Best Actress (nominated) - 46th Golden Butterfly Awards (2020)

References

External links 
 
 

1997 births
Turkish television actresses
Turkish film actresses
Actresses from Ankara
Living people